The Adventures of Mini-Goddess, also known as Ah! My Goddess: Being Small Is Convenient, is a Japanese animated TV series that aired 48 episodes between 1998 and 1999. It was directed by Hiroko Kazui and Yasuhiro Matsumura and was produced by Oriental Light and Magic. The series premiered on WOWOW as a part of the omnibus show Anime Complex. It was formerly distributed in North America by Geneon Entertainment. It is part of the Oh My Goddess! series, which follows the adventures of three goddesses (Belldandy, Urd, and Skuld) and their rat companion Gan-chan.

In Japan, the series aired on WOWOW between April 6, 1998 and March 29, 1999. The season was then released on DVD and VHS by Pony Canyon. Six VHS tapes were released between December 18, 1998 and October 20, 1999, and six DVDs were released between May 19, 1999 and October 20, 1999. A DVD box set was released in Japan on February 20, 2008. For Region 1, the season was licensed to Pioneer Entertainment (now Geneon Entertainment), and was released between February 12, 2002 and August 13, 2002 in four DVD compilations, each of which contained twelve episodes. Geneon released a limited-edition box set on July 1, 2003.

The series had two pieces of theme music, both ending themes. "" by Yuki Ishii served as the ending theme for episodes 1–24, and "XXX (Kiss Kiss Kiss)" by Splash! served as the ending theme for episodes 25–48.


Episode list

References

External links
 

Oh My Goddess!
Oh My Goddess episode lists